Yoga Nandeeshwara Temple is a Hindu temple in Nandi Hills or Nandidurg, Chikkaballapur district, Karnataka, India, is a dedicated to the Lord Shiva. Dates back to the Chola's Period.

References 

Chola architecture
Shiva temples in Karnataka